Ricky Dale Fenney (born December 7, 1964) is a former professional American football running back in the National Football League. Selected in the eighth round of the 1987 NFL Draft, he played five seasons for the Minnesota Vikings 

Born in Everett, Washington, Fenney graduated from Snohomish High School and played college football at the University of Washington in Seattle; he scored the final touchdown in the Huskies' Orange Bowl victory over Oklahoma in 

Fenney became a full-time financial planner after his retirement from the NFL. While working as a broker for Merrill Lynch, he started an investment fund and solicited investments from family and friends. Fenney covered up his losses and continued to solicit more cash from investors. Having lost $2.2 million of investor money, Fenney in 2004 was indicted on wire fraud charges for misleading investors. He was sentenced to 37 months in prison and was ordered to pay restitution. After serving his sentence at Federal Correctional Institution, Sheridan, he was released to a halfway house in Phoenix.

References

External links
 

1964 births
Living people
Sportspeople from Everett, Washington
Players of American football from Washington (state)
American football running backs
Minnesota Vikings players
Washington Huskies football players